Dr. Syntax is an 1894 play produced by DeWolf Hopper.  His wife at that time, Edna Wallace Hopper, appeared in the cast.

It debuted at the Broadway Theatre on June 23, 1894.  The play is a rewrite of the 1881-82 hit Cinderella at School.  The Best Plays of 1884-1899 (1955) says it had a "comfortable run of 159 performances."

References

External links
 

1894 plays